Walter "Willi" Knabenhans (born 15 February 1906, date of death unknown) was a Swiss cyclist. He competed in the sprint event at the 1928 Summer Olympics.

References

External links
 

1906 births
Year of death missing
Swiss male cyclists
Olympic cyclists of Switzerland
Cyclists at the 1928 Summer Olympics
Cyclists from Zürich